Burgas Central railway station is the main station serving the Black Sea city and municipality of Burgas, the fourth most populous city, and the largest and most important port, in Bulgaria.

Opened in 1903, the station is the terminus of the line from Karnobat, which links Burgas with the rest of Bulgaria's rail network.

See also
 Burgasbus
 Trolleybuses in Burgas

References

External links

Central Railway Station
Railway stations in Bulgaria
Railway stations opened in 1903
Central railway station